The 1897 American Cup was the thirteenth edition of the soccer tournament organized by the American Football Association. The Philadelphia Manz won this edition defeating defending champions Paterson True Blues after four attempts to complete the final. The committee for this season was H. Goldberg  as president, W. Turner as vice president, William Robertson as Secretary, and Hugh Wilkie as Treasurer. The Amateur Athlete was made the official publication of the association. The 'Victor ball' by the Overman Wheel Company was chosen as the official football for use in cup games. The association originally intended to have a league series and a cup tournament. They later dropped the league idea in favor of having each team play home and away games for the cup ties. If each team won a game, then the managers of each contesting team would flip a coin to see where the third game would take place. Players had to be registered 14 days before a game to be eligible to play.

Participants

First round
The first round draw took place at the AFA meeting in Ball's Union Hall at East Newark, New Jersey on October 10, 1896. The Scottish Americans drew the bye. The first round to be finished before Nov. 21.

True Blues: GK S.Simpson, FB W.Alexander, Binks, HB R.Hall, S.Findlay, J.Upton, FW L.Dodson, J.Oldfield, Robert Spencer, Harry Lauder, Tommie Turner. Taftville: G J.Brown, FB Gamble, Catterall, HB Baldwin, Wood, Ferguson, RW Smith, Montgomery, LW Nelson, Muttlewain, C W.Brown.

True Blues: GK S.Simpson, FB W.Alexander, Turner, HB R.Hall, S.Findlay, J.Upton, FW L.Dodson, J.Oldfield, Robert Spencer(c), Harry Lauder, Tommie Turner. Taftville: G J.Brown, FB Boyle, Seddon, HB Gamble, Woods(c), Hutchinson, FW Cottrell, Ferguson, Nelson, McIlvane, W.Brown.

Caledonians: GK Glynn, RFB Allan, LFB W.Mortimer, RHB R.Swithemby, CHB Joules, LHB Burns, RW Harty, Ross, C H.Singleton,  LW Holden, Furfey. Manz: GK Beaumont, RFB Wason, LFB Brown, RHB Cooper, CHB Gold, LHB Richmond, RW Carmichael, McCartney, C Steel, LW Kerr, Smith.

Caledonians forfeited the second match.

Crescents: GK J.Lees, FB R.Barr, H.McCrowe, HB White, Philibin, Vernon, RW R.Bloor, J.Band, C P.McGee, LW E.Grewcock, J.Flannery. Athletics: GK Arthur Hayes, FB William Flynn, Alfred Cutler, HB John McKance, Robert Taylor, Harry Singleton, FW William Salter, C.McGee, J.Nagle, David Douglas, William Marshall.

Crescents: GK J.Lees, FB R.Barr, H.McCrow, HB White, Philibin, Findley, RW R.Bloor, J.Band, C P.McGee, LW E.Grewcock, J.Flannery. Athletics: GK Arthur Hayes, FB William Flynn, Robert Taylor, HB John McKance, Alfred Cutler, Harry Singleton, FW William Salter, C.McGee, J.Nagle, Sampson, William Marshall.

Crescents: GK J.Lees, FB R.Barr, Grewcock, HB White, Findley, H.McCrowe, RW R.Bloor, W.Bunce, C P.McGee, LW J.Flannery, W.Clarkson. Athletics: GK Arthur Hayes, FB William Flynn, Robert Taylor, HB John McKance, Alfred Cutler, Harry Singleton, FW William Salter, C.McGee, J.Nagle, Sampson, William Marshall.

Second round
At the AFA meeting on November 28, 1896 at Union Hall in Newark, the committee drew for the semifinals pairing O.N.T. with Manz while the Scots and Athletics would playoff for the semifinal spot against the True Blues with five weeks to complete it.

Scots: GK Wildt, FB P.Wilson, P.Byrnes, HB G.Hopkins, T.Hopkins, R.McDonald, FW McCollough, Blackwood, Laverty, Paton, Gaffney. Athletics: GK Arthur Hayes, FB William Flynn, John McCance, HB Robert Taylor, Alfred Cutler, Harry Singleton, FW William Salter, C.McGee, J.Nagle, Harry Samson, William Marshall.

Scots: GK T.Hopkins, FB P.Wilson, Blackwood, HB J.Hopkins, Galloway, R.McDonell, FW Gemmell, Laverty, C McCollough, RW Paton, Gaffney. Athletics: GK Hayes, FB Flynn, Sansom, HB Taylor, Cutler, McCance, RW Salter, Douglass, C J.Nagle, LW C.McGee, Marshall.

Semifinals 
The second leg of the True Blue-Athletic semifinal was protested by the Athletics who disagreed with the referee's decision to eject a player.The AFA sustained the protest and ordered the game replayed. The AFA later reversed the decision at an April 17 meeting at Newark. The committee seeing that it was wrong to allow the protest awarded the series to the True Blues.

O.N.T.: GK Vrain, FB Winters, Kerr, HB Oliver, Christie, Montgomery(c), RW Neave, Hill, C Jones, LW Grundy, Clarke. Manz: GK Beaumont, FB Wilson, Wason, HB Gold, Morton, Richmond, LW McCartney, Carmichael, C Steel, RW Kerr, Colsey.

O.N.T.: GK Fitzpatrick, FB Winters, Kerr, HB Oliver, Christie, J.Jones, FW Neave, Hill, W.Jones, Montgomery(c), Clarke. Manz: GK Beaumont, FB Brown, Wason(c), HB Gold, Morton, Richmond, FW McCartney, Carmichael, Steel, Kerr, Colsey.

Athletics: GK A.Hayes, FB W.Flynn, R.Sansom, HB R.Taylor, Singleton, McCance, RW Salter, H.Sansom, C J.Nagle, LW H.McGee, W.Marshall. True Blues: GK S.Simpson, FB W.Alexander, T.Turner, HB R.Hall, S.Findlay, J.Upton, FW L.Dodson, J.Oldfield, Robert Spencer, R.Brown, Turner.

Athletics: GK A.Hayes, FB W.Flynn, R.Sansom, HB Saggus, Singleton, McCance, RW Salter, Douglass, C J.Nagle, LW H.McGee(c), Taylor. True Blues: GK S.Simpson, FB W.Alexander, T.Turner, HB R.Hall, S.Findlay, J.Upton, FW L.Dodson, J.Oldfield, Robert Spencer, R.Brown, Turner.

Athletics: GK A.Hayes, FB W.Flynn, R.Sansom, HB Saggus, Singleton, McCance, FW Salter, Taylor, J.Nagle, H.McGee(c), Marshall. True Blues: GK S.Simpson, FB W.Alexander, T.Turner, HB R.Hall, S.Findlay, J.Upton, FW L.Dodson, J.Oldfield, Robert Spencer, R.Brown, Turner.

Final 
The True Blues of Paterson were entering their third AFA Cup final losing in 1894 and winning in 1896. The Manz team of Philadelphia reached the final having only one loss during the season, that being to the losing semifinalist Kearny Athletics on Christmas Day. The teams split the first two games requiring a deciding game at a neutral site. The third installment resulted in a tie at the end of regulation after which the referee called for 30 minutes additional time however the result remained level and the replay was set for May 22 at Newark.

True Blues: GK Simpson, FB W.Alexander, T.Turner, HB R.Hall, Finley, J.Upton, RW Dodson, James Oldfield, C Robert Spencer(c), LW Brown, T.A. Turner. Manz: GK Miller, FB Brown, Wason(c), HB Wilson, Morton, Richmond, RW McCartney, Carmichael, C Steel, LW Kerr, Colsey.

True Blues: GK Simpson, FB W.Alexander, Turner, HB R.Hall, Findlay, G.Eaton, RW Dodson, James Oldfield, C Robert Spencer, LW Brown, H.Lauder. Manz: GK Miller, FB Brown, Wason(c), HB Wilson, Morton, Richmond, RW McCartney, Carmichael, C Steel, LW Kerr, Colsey.

True Blues: GK Simpson, FB W.Alexander, Turner, HB R.Hall, Findley, Upton, RW Dodson, James Oldfield, C Robert Spencer, LW Brown, Lauder. Manz: GK Beaumont, FB Brown, Wason(c), HB Gold, McCartney, Richmond, LW Wilson, Carmichael, C Steel, RW Kerr, Colsey.

True Blues: GK Simpson, FB W.Alexander, Turner, HB R.Hall, Findley, Upton, RW Dodson, James Oldfield, C Robert Spencer, LW R.Brown, Lauder. Manz: GK Beaumont, FB Brown, Wason(c), HB Gold, Colsey, Richmond, LW Wilson, Carmichael, C Steel, RW Kerr, McCartney.

References 

1897